Tappoch Broch, better known as Torwood Broch, is an iron-age broch located in a remote spot in dense woodland near Falkirk, Scotland.

History
Tappoch broch was first excavated in 1864  by Colonel Joseph Dundas. Small-scale excavations have taken place near the site sporadically since. Recently, a conservation project run by Archaeology Scotland and grant aided by Forestry Commission Scotland cleared the site of scrub vegetation. The broch was then surveyed by laser scanning.

Description
The chamber of the broch, whose walls are about six metres thick, still reach a height of two or three metres, but in recent times whole wall sections have collapsed. The dry stonework is built of large, irregular stone blocks from the immediate vicinity. The oval chamber measures 10.8 to 9.8 metres, is paved and has a large fire spot in the middle. Access, with some of the fallen stones still in situ, is from the southeast. About halfway down the passage is a stop for a door with a latch for the door beam. In the south-west of the chamber a short aisle branches off to the right and leads to an unusually well-preserved staircase in the wall. In 1864 there were still eleven steps, some of which were later lost. The side walls of the stairs slope inwards, which indicates that it was originally designed as a cantilever vault. A small chamber in the north-east of the wall appears to be of modern origin.

The site has been designated a scheduled monument.

Archaeological Finds
Unlike other Lowland Brochs such as Leckie Broch artefacts recovered from Tappoch were relatively sparse with no Roman material on site. Finds included saddle and rotary querns, a potential stone 'lamp' and several sherds of coarse pottery.

Images

References

 Part of this article is based on the equivalent article (:de:Broch von Tappoch) on German Wikipedia.

External links

 Tappoch Broch - Undiscovered Scotland: The Ultimate Online Guide
 Torwood Broch Poster - Forestry Commission Scotland

Brochs
Scheduled Ancient Monuments in Falkirk